Rokitki may refer to the following places in Poland:
Rokitki, Lower Silesian Voivodeship (south-west Poland)
Rokitki, Kuyavian-Pomeranian Voivodeship (north-central Poland)
Rokitki, Bytów County in Pomeranian Voivodeship (north Poland)
Rokitki, Kartuzy County in Pomeranian Voivodeship (north Poland)
Rokitki, Tczew County in Pomeranian Voivodeship (north Poland)